Barbourofelidae is an extinct family of carnivorans of the suborder Feliformia, sometimes known as false saber-toothed cats, that lived in North America, Eurasia and Africa during the Miocene epoch (16.9—9.0 million years ago) and existed for about .

Taxonomy

The type genus, Barbourofelis, was originally described by Schultz et al. (1970) and assigned to a new tribe, Barbourofelini, within the felid subfamily Machairodontinae, along with the other sabre-toothed cats. Subsequently, the tribe was reassigned to the Nimravidae by Tedford (1978) and raised to a subfamily by Bryant (1991). However, a number of studies in the early 2000s identified a closer affinity of the barbourofelines to the Felidae than to the Nimravidae and they were reranked as a distinct family by Morlo et al. (2004). Since then the prevailing view has the barbourofelids as the sister group to the Felidae, although this has recently been challenged, following the description of the middle Miocene genus Oriensmilus from northern China, which provided evidence, mainly based on basicranial morphology, that barbourofelids may be more closely related to nimravids than to felids.

Barbourofelids first appear in the fossil record in the Early Miocene of Africa. By the end of the Early Miocene, a land bridge had opened between Africa and Eurasia, allowing for a faunal exchange between the two continents. Barbourofelids migrated at least three times from Africa to Europe. While the genus Sansanosmilus evolved in Europe, barbourofelids also migrated through Eurasia and reached North America by the late Miocene, represented there solely by the genus Barbourofelis.

Classification

Phylogeny
The phylogenetic relationships of Barbourofelidae are shown in the following cladogram:

References

 
Miocene carnivorans
Prehistoric mammal families
Miocene first appearances